The 1925–26 Clarkson Golden Knights men's ice hockey season was the 6th season of play for the program. The team was coached by Gordon Croskery in his 3rd season.

Season
After a dismal season the year before, the program had nowhere to go than up. The team lost seven of its nine players to graduation, but that was a blessing in disguise as it allowed professor Croskery to swiftly remake the team. With the temporary on-campus rink not being sufficient, a new venue was built in Ives Park and practice began in earnest immediately after Christmas. 20 men showed up for the start, which was not an inconsiderable number for a school boasting a student body of less than 1,000. The team got in as much practice as they could before heading down to Ithaca for their first match. From the start the team looked much better than it had the year before, skating up and down the ice against Cornell The game was close throughout and Clarkson had a chance to end their losing streak all the way until the end, but ultimately fell 1–2.

The second game for tech would be their first at the new rink and they played host to Syracuse. Sensing a chance for the Knights to win, a large crowd of about 1,000 people showed up to the game. They were witness, however, to a masterful performance by the Orange netminder, Beishline, who turned away every Clarkson shot and allowed his team to win 4–0. Nearly two weeks passed before the third game but the extra practice time seemed to spark the Knights offense. Against the Cornwall Greys, an amateur club from Canada, Clarkson debuted their new goalie, John Klube. The team got down 2–5 after two periods but came storming back in the third. Wayland made a name for himself in the game as the Knights' comeback came up just short but the with the team playing much better it was only a matter of time before they finally won a game.

The finally happened against the Winter Park Club from Ogdensburg. Even when they were missing their normal center, Jack Croskery, Tech ended their 10-game losing streak one day shy of the 2-year anniversary of their last win. Warm weather melted the ice for their next game, the first in program history against local college St. Lawrence. The Larries were fielding a varsity team for the first time and Clarkson welcomed them with an ice surface that was little better than a pond. Wayland was again the star for the team in their 1–0 win.

Clarkson ended its 4-game home stand and headed down to play Hamilton, who were having another strong season. The Knights were keen to improve on their 0–9 loss from a year before and did just that, scoring 5 times against the Continentals. Unfortunately, Tech couldn't pull away from Hamilton and ended up losing the match in overtime. Clarkson ended the year with a pair of game, the first a rematch with St. Lawrence on their rink. The change of venue didn't alter the result, however, and Clarkson won the game despite it devolving into a physical contest. The final game came against the Junior Chamber of Commerce team at Watertown and got a strong effort from their opposition. The game was close for the first half of the match, with Watertown twice taking a lead, but Clarkson proved stronger as the game went on and outpaced their opposition in the later half.

The vast improvement of the team over the course of the season, particularly since most of the players would be back next year, signaled good fortune for the Golden Knights in the near future.

Roster

Standings

Schedule and Results

|-
!colspan=12 style=";" | Regular Season

References

Clarkson Golden Knights men's ice hockey seasons
Clarkson
Clarkson
Clarkson
Clarkson